The term no greater love is derived from a well-known verse of the New Testament (John 15): "Greater love hath no man than this, that a man lay down his life for his friends", often invoked in the context of self-sacrifice. This specific excerpt may refer to:

Books, films and TV
 No Greater Love (novel), a 1991 novel by Danielle Steel
 "No Greater Love" (Only Fools and Horses), an episode of Only Fools and Horses
 Greater Love Hath No Man (1915 film), a 1915 American silent film starring Emmett Corrigan
 No Greater Love (1932 film), a 1932 American film starring Alexander Carr
 No Greater Love (1952 film), a 1952 German film
 No Greater Love (1959 film), the first part of the Japanese film series The Human Condition
 No Greater Love (1960 film), a 1960 American film
 No Greater Love (1996 film), a 1996 American TV film based on the Danielle Steel novel
 No Greater Love (2009 film), a documentary about the Discalced Order of Carmelite Nuns in London, England
 No Greater Love (2010 fim), a 2010 American film

Music
 No Greater Love (album), a 1999 album by jazz musician Joe McPhee
 "No Greater Love", a song included on Kaleidoscope (Rachael Lampa album)
 "There Is No Greater Love", a 1936 jazz standard by Isham Jones and Marty Symes
 "No Greater Love", a song by Jars of Clay from The Shelter, 2010

Other uses
 No Greater Love (charity), an American humanitarian, non-profit organization

See also 
 Maiorem hac dilectionem (Latin for 'Greater love than this'), a 2017 apostolic letter